The Benjamin Clayton Black House (also known as the Black House) is a historic house located at 300 East Race Street in Searcy, Arkansas.

Description and history 
Built shortly before the American Civil War and extensively updated in 1872, it is one of the earliest examples of Queen Anne architecture surviving in the state. Originally constructed as a single-story two-room structure, it was expanded by the Black family, adding a third room to the rear and a complete second story, and adorning the building with period woodwork. This is most evident in the two-story front porch, which exhibits ornamental latticework, turned posts, and brackets.

The house was listed on the National Register of Historic Places on November 20, 1974.

See also
National Register of Historic Places listings in White County, Arkansas

References

Houses on the National Register of Historic Places in Arkansas
Victorian architecture in Arkansas
Houses completed in 1859
Houses in Searcy, Arkansas
National Register of Historic Places in Searcy, Arkansas
Tourist attractions in White County, Arkansas
1859 establishments in Arkansas
Queen Anne architecture in Arkansas